is a professional Japanese baseball player. He plays outfielder for the Hokkaido Nippon-Ham Fighters.

References 

2000 births
Living people
Baseball people from Saitama Prefecture
Chuo University alumni
Japanese baseball players
Nippon Professional Baseball outfielders
Hokkaido Nippon-Ham Fighters players